The flag of the Transcaucasian Socialist Federative Soviet Republic was adopted by the Transcaucasian Socialist Federative Soviet Republic in 1925. It consists of a red star bordered by gold in the canton, surrounded by a semicircle with the letters "ЗСФСР" in gold.

Prior to 1925, the flag was red with the Cyrillic characters  in gold.

References

External links
 

Transcaucasian Socialist Federative Soviet Republic
Transcaucasian Socialist Federative Soviet Republic